Girl Talk (also released as Oscar Peterson Plays for Lovers) is a 1968 studio album by jazz pianist Oscar Peterson, the second volume of his Exclusively for My Friends series. It was compiled from live studio sessions recorded between 1964 and 1966.

Reception

Writing for AllMusic, critic Ken Dryden wrote "The title track, an overlooked gem jointly written by Bobby Troup and Neal Hefti, finds the leader in a bluesy mood. The relaxed but jaunty treatment of "Robbin's Nest" follows a powerful medley of "I Concentrate on You" and "Moon River" to wrap up this highly recommended session."

The Penguin Guide to Jazz included the album in its suggested "Core Collection".

Track listing
 "On a Clear Day (You Can See Forever)" (Burton Lane, Alan Jay Lerner) – 4:27
 "I'm in the Mood for Love" (Dorothy Fields, Jimmy McHugh) – 17:22
 "Girl Talk" (Neal Hefti, Bobby Troup) – 5:41
 Medley: "I Concentrate on You"/"Moon River" (Cole Porter)/(Henry Mancini, Johnny Mercer) – 6:30
 "Robbins' Nest" (Illinois Jacquet, Bob Russell, Sir Charles Thompson) – 6:21

Personnel

Performance
 Oscar Peterson – piano, all tracks
 Ray Brown - double bass on "Robbin's Nest", "I Concentrate On You"/"Moon River"
 Sam Jones – double bass on "I'm in the Mood for Love"
 Bobby Durham – drums on "On a Clear Day", "Girl Talk"
 Louis Hayes - drums on "I'm In The Mood For Love", "Robbin's Nest", "I Concentrate On You"/"Moon River"

References

1968 albums
Oscar Peterson albums
MPS Records albums